The failed Mutiny of Cambiazo occurred during the 1851 Chilean Revolution in Punta Arenas.

The leader of the mutiny, José Miguel Cambiazo, had arrived to Punta Arenas as part of the company "La Fija de Magallanes". In October 1851, 29 convicts arrived to Punta Arenas, among them 7 liberal rebels who had been defeated in April 1851. After an incident involving another officer Cambiazo was incarcerated. In November 1851 Cambiazo made a failed attempt to capture the barque Tres Amigos. The military commander of Punta Arenas, Benjamín Muñoz Gamero, pardoned Cambiazo for this attempt.

In November 21, Cambiazo and other mutineers took control of the colony with the aid of other liberal soldiers. Muñoz was made prisoner. The Chilean ships Indefatigable and Meteoro plus the Royal Navy ship  participated in the recapture of Punta Arenas.

References

Conflicts in 1851
1851 in Chile
Cambiazo, Mutiny of
Rebellions in Chile
History of Magallanes Region
November 1851 events
19th-century crimes in Chile